John Joseph Theodore Rzeznik (born December 5, 1965) is an American singer-songwriter, best known as the founder, guitarist and frontman of the American rock band Goo Goo Dolls, with whom he has recorded 14 studio albums.

Early life
Rzeznik was born in Buffalo, New York, the youngest of five children and only son of Edith (née Pomeroy) and Joe Rzeznik, a bar proprietor and postal clerk. Both of Rzeznik's parents were musicians, playing the clarinet and flute. Rzeznik had a strict Catholic upbringing in Buffalo's working-class East Side Polish neighborhood and attended Corpus Christi Grammar School. All four of Rzeznik's grandparents were born in Poland. The original pronunciation of his last name Rzeźnik is "Zhezh-neek" (zh as in beige) , Polish for "butcher".

Rzeznik's father died at the age of 53 on February 2, 1981, from a diabetic coma when Rzeznik was 15 years old. On October 26, 1982, his mother died at the age of 51 from a sudden heart attack in the family's living room. Having lost both of his parents, he was brought up by his four older sisters, Phyllis, Fran, Gladys and Kate, with help from their cousin, John Guljas. He paid for his own apartment using Social Security Survivor Benefit checks. It was during this period and while attending McKinley Vocational High School that Rzeznik began playing the guitar. He briefly attended Buffalo State College, dropping out after his first year.

Career

Goo Goo Dolls

In 1985, Rzeznik formed the band that became the Goo Goo Dolls with Robby Takac. Previously Rzeznik had been in a band with Takac's cousin, called The Beaumonts.

In the early days of the Goo Goo Dolls, the band performed at gigs relentlessly, with Takac as the frontman (Rzeznik gradually becoming the frontman over the next few albums, as each new album contained more songs sung by Rzeznik than the last). They were soon picked up by a small record label, Celluloid. Under Celluloid, they released their first eponymous album on a $750 budget (later the re-prints would be referred to as "First Release"). This attracted the attention of a larger record label, Metal Blade, who released their next few albums. 

For the next few years, the band toured and worked on new material. The band received early success with the single "Name" as well as being featured in Freddy's Dead: The Final Nightmare with the song "I'm Awake Now". Fast forward to their album Dizzy Up The Girl, the single "Iris" became a critical success due in large part to the release of the film City of Angels and it being a featured music video for the film.

Other activity
Following the album Gutterflower, Rzeznik wrote "Always Know Where You Are" and "I'm Still Here" for the Disney film Treasure Planet, which were also released as a single independently from the band.

From October to December 2007, Rzeznik was a judge alongside Sheila E. and Australian Idol judge and marketing manager Ian "Dicko" Dickson on the Fox network's The Next Great American Band.

On June 19, 2008, Rzeznik was inducted into the Songwriters Hall of Fame and was awarded the Hal David Starlight Award.

On March 24, 2014, Cash Cash released their new single "Lightning". The single featured Rzeznik on vocals and was written by Cash Cash and Rzeznik together.

On November 29, 2020, he participated in a virtual fundraiser to help combat hunger and raise money for the Community Foodbank of New Jersey.

Musical style

Influences
Most of the music Rzeznik listened to while growing up was influenced by his sisters, and consisted of classic rock such as The Rolling Stones and The Kinks. The youngest of his four older sisters moved towards punk music and Rzeznik became interested in bands such as Ramones and The Clash. Rzeznik attributes his gift for melody to listening to bands such as Kiss, Cheap Trick, The Cure and Rush in the early 1980s. Rzeznik also cites Paul Westerberg as an "obvious influence" on his music. Westerberg co-wrote the 1993 Goo Goo Dolls song "We Are the Normal" with Rzeznik, who reflected on the experience by stating "To some people, Keith Richards is their hero. I feel that way about Westerberg. Keith Richards got to do his thing with Chuck Berry, and I got to do it with Westerberg. That was amazing to me."

Rzeznik has stated that his dream collaboration would be with singer/songwriter Grace VanderWaal.

Songwriting
Rzeznik believes writing is not just an inspirational act but that writing music is "ninety nine percent perspiration." He says that when writing a song, he often "runs tape and screws around with stuff," and his songs are often both biographical and autobiographical. According to Rzeznik, before penning down the song "Iris", he was on the verge of leaving the band because he had been writing songs for the past nine years and it had been a low. However, Rzeznik was approached for writing the soundtrack of the movie City of Angels, and after watching the movie, Rzeznik penned down the song, which changed the band's career.

Guitar tunings
Rzeznik is known for his use of alternate guitar tunings in his songs. Rzeznik has said that he would "basically sit there at night and just start tuning my guitar strings up and down until something sounded really cool." For example, "Iris" is played with the guitar tuned to BDDDDD.

Notable performances
At the 2004 Fashion Rocks! concert in New York, Rzeznik performed a duet version of the song Iris with Canadian pop-punk singer Avril Lavigne.
The Goo Goo Dolls also performed the song "Name" at a live concert with LeAnn Rimes. Rzeznik also performed Pink Floyd's "Wish You Were Here" with Fred Durst from Limp Bizkit for the victims of September 11 as a tribute to the heroes.

On July 4, 2004, Rzeznik and his bandmates returned home to Buffalo and played a free show to give back to their loyal fans, over 60,000 of whom attended. The day quickly became a city triumph when rain came pouring down during their performance. It turned out to be one of the strongest rainstorms of the year in Buffalo, but the Goo Goo Dolls did not stop playing. Rzeznik declared, "We're going to keep going until this shit stops". This performance was captured on DVD and CD for the public in the Goo Goo Dolls release Live in Buffalo: July 4, 2004.

Equipment
After the Goo Goo Dolls' equipment was stolen from a van in New York City (including Rzeznik's Marshall JCM800 amplifier and his only guitar at the time), following the recording of their 1989 album, Jed, a custom, yellow Stratocaster-style guitar (later nicknamed "Boing") was made for Rzeznik by ESP. Now without an amplifier, Rzeznik borrowed a near-identical Marshall JCM800 from a mutual friend of the band, Charles Root. This amp was then used to record Hold Me Up and Superstar Car Wash. Since the late '90s, Rzeznik has used Fender electric guitars. He has used many variations such as the Stratocaster, Telecaster, Jaguar and a "Halfcaster" (a Stratocaster cut in half). He also used Guild acoustic guitars on the "Dizzy Up the Girl" and "Gutterflower" tours. Rzeznik noted in a 2003 interview that "No matter what guitar I have, it seems that anything with strings makes music to my ears."

Personal life
Rzeznik met former model Laurie Farinacci in 1990, married her in 1993 but divorced in 2003; they did not have any children. He started dating Melina Gallo in 2005 and married her in Malibu, California, on July 26, 2013. On December 22, 2016, he and Gallo had their first child, a daughter, Liliana. Rzeznik and his family reside in Westfield, New Jersey.

Rzeznik is a recovering alcoholic. In a 2018 interview, he reported that he had been sober for nearly four years.

Discography

Goo Goo Dolls (1986), Celluloid Records later re-released as First Release (1987), Metal Blade Records
Jed (1989), Metal Blade Records
Hold Me Up (1990), Metal Blade Records
Superstar Car Wash (1993), Warner Bros. Records
A Boy Named Goo (1995), Warner Bros. Records
Dizzy Up The Girl (1998), Warner Bros. Records
Gutterflower (2002), Warner Bros. Records
Let Love In (2006), Warner Bros. Records
Something for the Rest of Us (2010), Warner Bros. Records
Magnetic (2013), Warner Bros. Records
Boxes (2016), Warner Bros. Records
Miracle Pill (2019)
It's Christmas All Over (2020)
Chaos In Bloom (2022)

Solo singles

Collaborations/individual discography
Limp Bizkit and Johnny Rzeznik – "Wish You Were Here" – America: A Tribute to Heroes (2001)
"Always Know Where You Are" – Treasure Planet (2002)
"For Your Love" – with The Yardbirds – Birdland (2003)
"Once in a Lifetime" – Good Morning, Miami theme (2002)
"All I Want is You" – Les Paul & Friends: American Made World Played (2005)
"Men of War" – with Steve Morse & Michael Lee Jackson (original version from the Gillan album, Double Trouble) – Gillan's Inn (2006)
"Lightning" – with Cash Cash (2014)

References and notes

External links

 Goo Goo Dolls official site
 Interview with Goo Goo Dolls
 

1965 births
20th-century American singers
21st-century American singers
Alternative rock guitarists
Alternative rock singers
American alternative rock musicians
American male singer-songwriters
American people of Polish descent
American rock guitarists
American male guitarists
American rock singers
American rock songwriters
American baritones
Goo Goo Dolls members
Lead guitarists
Living people
Musicians from Buffalo, New York
Singer-songwriters from New York (state)
Guitarists from New York (state)
20th-century American guitarists